Lauri Antero Kivi (15 April 1904 – 29 June 1981) was a Finnish discus thrower who won the silver medal at the 1928 Summer Olympics.

References

1904 births
1981 deaths
People from Orivesi
People from Häme Province (Grand Duchy of Finland)
Finnish male discus throwers
Olympic athletes of Finland
Olympic silver medalists for Finland
Athletes (track and field) at the 1928 Summer Olympics
Medalists at the 1928 Summer Olympics
Olympic silver medalists in athletics (track and field)
Sportspeople from Pirkanmaa